Aparescus praecox is a species of beetle in the family Cerambycidae, and the only species in the genus Aparescus. It was described by Kolbe in 1900.

References

Tragocephalini
Beetles described in 1900